In statistics, a variables sampling plan is an acceptance sampling technique. Plans for variables are intended for quality characteristics that are measured on a continuous scale. This plan requires the knowledge of the statistical model (e.g. normal distribution). The historical evolution of this technique dates back to the seminal work of W. Allen Wallis (1943). The purpose of a plan for variables is to assess whether the process is operating far enough from the specification limit. Plans for variables may produce a similar OC curve to attribute plans with significantly less sample size.

The decision criterion of these plans are 
 or 
When the above expression is satisfied the proportion nonconforming is lower than expected and therefore the lot is accepted.

A variables sampling plan can be designed so that the OC curve passes through two points (AQL,) and (LQL,). The required sample size and the critical distance can be obtained as

where  is the normal distribution function.

When the dispersion is known the required sample size is obtained from 

while for unknown  the sample size is approximately 

The MIL-STD-414 provides tables to obtain the required sample size and the critical distance according to the type of inspection.

External links 
OC curve

See also 

 Acceptance sampling

References

 
 Online MIL-STD-414 Calculator (SQC Online)

Further reading
 

Sampling (statistics)